Georges Galinat (born 15 August 1904, date of death unknown) was a French boxer. He competed in the 1924 Summer Olympics. In 1924, Gallant was eliminated in the first round of the heavyweight class after losing his fight to Ed Greathouse of the United States.

References

External links

1904 births
Year of death missing
Heavyweight boxers
Olympic boxers of France
Boxers at the 1924 Summer Olympics
French male boxers